Chideock is a village and civil parish in south west Dorset, England, situated close to the English Channel between Bridport and Lyme Regis. Dorset County Council's 2013 estimate of the parish population is 550.

Chideock's economy mostly comprises agriculture (arable and pastoral) and tourism. The parish includes part of the Jurassic Coast, a World Heritage Site.

During much of its history Chideock has had a strong tradition of Catholicism; in the late 16th century four Chideock men were executed for their faith and became known as the Chideock Martyrs. There is a memorial to the men in the village.

The A35 trunk road passes through the village, which means the main street can have high volumes of traffic.

History
In 1086 Chideock was recorded in the Domesday Book as 'Cidihoc'. In 1379–80 John de Chideock, a manorial lord, built Chideock Castle just north of the village. During the Middle Ages ownership passed to the Catholic Arundell family, who used it to provide refuge for priests and loyal followers during subsequent religious persecution. During the Protestant reign of Elizabeth I the Arundell estate became Dorset's main centre of Catholicism, and the locality witnessed considerable religious strife. Four local Catholic men—John Cornelius, Thomas Bosgrave, John Carey and  Patrick Salmon—were martyred in the late 16th century; their trial took place in the main hall of what is now Chideock House Hotel and they were executed in Dorchester. The men became known as the Chideock Martyrs. A fifth man, Hugh Green, who became Chideock's chaplain in 1612, was tried and executed in 1642. All five were beatified on 15 December 1929.

During the English Civil War Chideock was a royalist stronghold, and the castle changed hands more than once before it was ultimately left ruinous in 1645 by parliamentarian forces under the Governor of Lyme Regis, Colonel Ceeley. Chideock House Hotel may have been the headquarters of General Fairfax as he planned the castle's overthrowing. Parts of the castle remained standing until at least 1733 but only some of the moat can be seen today; it is in a field, accessed by Ruins Lane, and marked by a crucifix as a memorial to the martyrs.

In 1802 the Arundells were succeeded by the Weld family of Lulworth Castle who in 1810 built Chideock Manor. The Welds were also Catholic and in 1870-2 Charles Weld designed and built the village's Roman Catholic church in an unusual Romanesque style. It is dedicated to Our Lady Queen of Martyrs, and St Ignatius and remains in trust to the Weld family.

Among other surviving relics claimed by this location is St. Thomas More's hair shirt, sent to Margaret Roper the day before his martyrdom and later presented for safe keeping by Margaret Clement. This was long in the custody of the community of Augustinian canonesses who, until 1983, lived at the convent at Abbotskerswell Priory, Devon. More recent sources, however, state that the shirt is now preserved at the Roman Catholic Buckfast Abbey, part of a Benedictine monastery, in Devon.

Governance
Chideock is in the electoral ward of Chideock and Symondsbury, which encompasses much of the coast between Charmouth and West Bay plus inland beyond Symondsbury. The total population of this ward is 1,745. This ward is one of 32 that comprise the West Dorset parliamentary constituency, which is currently represented in the UK national parliament by the Conservative Chris Loder.

Geography

Fossilised ammonites and belemnites can often be found on the beach due to continued coastal erosion of the soft blue lias clays which make up the cliffs. Iron-rich rocks such as lodestone and magnetite can also be found on the beaches near the village – these are thought to have been transported down the coast from Chesil Beach, having been deposited there by a shipwreck in the 1800s. Similar collections of these rocks can be found on beaches along the Jurassic Coast and in the neighbouring counties of Hampshire and the Isle of Wight.

Demography
Dorset County Council's 2013 estimate of the parish population is 550.

The population of the parish in the censuses between 1921 and 2001 is shown in the table below:

Results of the 2011 census have been published for the combined populations of Chideock parish and the small neighbouring parish of Stanton St Gabriel; the combined population was 686.

Transport
The A35 trunk road between Honiton and Southampton passes through Chideock, which in 1997 was the first village in Britain to have two speed cameras installed in response to perceived excessive speed. The National Trust refused permission for a prospective bypass over land it owns to the north of Golden Cap, citing its importance as an area of natural beauty. On 4 May 2010 a protest against the lack of a bypass was initiated by some residents and involved constant operation of a pedestrian crossing at the centre of the village for one hour's duration every week. This campaign continued for a year and may result in restrictions on heavy goods vehicles in the village.

References

External links 

Church of Our Lady, Queen of Martyrs, and St. Ignatius, Chideock
St Giles Parish Church

Villages in Dorset